Dundalk (Tripp Field) Aerodrome  is an aerodrome located  east of Dundalk, Ontario.

References

Registered aerodromes in Ontario
Buildings and structures in Grey County